This is a list of the National Register of Historic Places listings in Wrangell–St. Elias National Park and Preserve.

This is intended to be a complete list of the properties and districts on the National Register of Historic Places in Wrangell-St. Elias National Park and Preserve, Alaska, United States.  The locations of National Register properties and districts for which the latitude and longitude coordinates are included below, may be seen in a Google map.

There are 9 properties and districts listed on the National Register in the park. One property is a National Historic Landmark District.

Current listings 

|}

See also 

 National Register of Historic Places listings in Copper River Census Area, Alaska
 List of National Historic Landmarks in Alaska
 National Register of Historic Places listings in Alaska

References

Wrangell Saint Elias